Francis Jackson (born between 1815 and 1820), also known as Frank Jackson, was an African-American kidnapping victim. He was born free, but enticed into helping to drive horses to Virginia, a slave state, and was sold into slavery in early 1851. Besides escaping a number of times over seven years, there were three legal cases fought in Virginia and North Carolina. It seemed to be settled with the Francis Jackson vs. John W. Deshazer case when he was ruled to be free in 1855, but he was held as a slave until 1858. Jackson lived a continual cycle of being sold to new slaveholders, running away, getting caught, and then being returned to his latest owner.

He was sold to as many as twelve slaveholders in Virginia, South Carolina, and ultimately in Moore County, North Carolina. An attorney, George Cameron Mendenhall, visited him in jail in North Carolina after he ran away from a nearby plantation. Believing Jackson's chain of events, Mendenhall filed legal proceedings that ultimately freed him in August 1858.

During the time that he was enslaved, abolitionists from Pennsylvania tried to track him down and provide legal evidence and depositions that he was free. Their attempts were thwarted for years. Legal certificates of freedom were ignored and he was moved, making it harder for him to be found. After he was freed, he returned to the New Castle, Pennsylvania area and was married by 1860. Despite an infirmity, he enlisted in the United States Colored Troops and was honorably discharged.

Early life
Born between 1815 and 1820 in Mercer County, Pennsylvania, Francis Jackson was the son of Elijah and Sarah, also known as Sally. At the time of his birth, both of his parents were free African Americans.  Sarah was freed in 1813 when she was 28 years of age in accordance with the An Act for the Gradual Abolition of Slavery. Any children born after she attained her freedom were free as well. Elijah and Sarah were married in 1815.

Jackson was the oldest of Sally and Elijah's four or five children. He lived in the New Castle, Pennsylvania area for years. He was raised by a farmer and an "ardent abolitionist", John Young, of Indian Run, north of New Castle. Young was a conductor on the Underground Railroad. Jackson lived in West Greenville, Pennsylvania (north of New Castle) by the time that he was kidnapped.

Kidnapping
Charles May, a drover and horse trader, asked Jackson in early 1851 to help him drive horses to Baltimore, Maryland. Fearing that he would be taken through Virginia, a slave state, Jackson did not consent until May promised that he would remain free.

Virginia

After the horses were delivered to Baltimore or Virginia, Jackson was put up for sale at a Richmond, Virginia slave auction by May. He was sold to Samuel Scott. It was said that the transaction took place without Jackson's knowledge.

Rumors of Jackson's kidnapping reached New Castle soon after he left the state and had not returned when expected. William Stewart of Mercer County and Judge John Reynolds of New Castle attempted to bring Jackson back to Pennsylvania by providing proof that he was free. Jackson was in the Campbell County Courthouse before June 1851 when George C. Morgan attempted to provide papers that showed that Jackson was free. When he reached the courthouse, he was told that Jackson was not there; he had been sold to someone further south. In 1851 and 1852, the Free Presbyterian and The Anti-Slavery Bugle newspapers tracked his case and published information about his whereabouts.

Jackson took every chance he could to escape, particularly in the first nine months of servitude. In one incident, he was caught and taken to the Botetourt County, Virginia jail, in Fincastle. Behind the scenes, there were attempts to keep Jackson in slavery. One official "treacherously" ignored the certificates of his freedom sent to Fincastle and Jackson was moved to unknown locations.

Jackson was found to have been in Richmond at the Jones's Negro Jail by August 1851. He was visited by William John Clark, a slaveholder, who said in a letter to Judge Reynolds that he did not want to see anyone who was rightfully free being enslaved and for fifteen years had aided people who were wrongfully enslaved. Although the slaveholder was willing and able to offer assistance, Jackson was moved to a county jail a hundred miles away.

After Jackson was arrested in Botetourt County, he filed his first lawsuit against Scott, stating that he was illegally enslaved. It was filed on October 14, 1851, at the Superior Court of Law and Chancery in Campbell County. W.A. Glass, an attorney from the city, sought and received proof that he was a free man from New Castle and Mercer County, Pennsylvania. A witness from Virginia stated that Jackson had said he was previously enslaved by May's father and belonged to another slaveholder when he was sold to Scott. The case went to trial in October 1853 with depositions by three people who knew the Jacksons in Pennsylvania and stated that they were free. The depositions were taken of Judge Reynolds, James S. Cossett, and Henry Pearson. The case was dismissed and Jackson was transferred to John W. Deshazer. Jackson escaped and was found in New London and was taken to the jail in Campbell County.

Since he was kidnapped, Jackson learned that the justice and legal system worked efficiently for slaveholders, and people who were wrongly enslaved had a very hard time being heard and proven free. The lawsuit Francis Jackson vs. John W. Deshazer was filed in Campbell County, Virginia claiming that Jackson's employment brought him to Richmond, Virginia, where he was kidnapped and sold into slavery. Benjamin Ferris took on his case and obtained affidavits from Pennsylvania, including Jackson's neighbors and Judge Reynolds who knew Jackson but they were not accepted for the case. An official from Campbell County said that he would only accept affidavits from people who were white.

Ferris found acceptable witnesses from Pennsylvania who attested that Jackson and his parents were free. Deshazer had one witness, Lewis E. Williams, who recounted the sales to Scott and then Deshazer. Before the case was settled, Jackson escaped. The judge discontinued Jackson's case without prejudice, meaning that if Jackson was later found to be enslaved, the case could be tried based on the evidence provided in this case.

Around October 1855, the Francis Jackson vs. John W. Deshazer case was finalized and Jackson was declared free.

Intervening years

Over several years, Jackson had a continuous cycle where he would escape, get captured and jailed, and then returned to a slaveholder. He had ten to twelve slaveholders in Virginia, South Carolina, and North Carolina.

North Carolina
Jackson was taken south, just over the Virginia state line into North Carolina. He was sold as a slave to a planter there. While in jail for escaping, Jackson had the occasion to talk with George Cameron Mendenhall—a Quaker, a slaveholder, and an attorney. Jackson explained what had happened to him since he lived in Pennsylvania. Mendenhall believed him and wrote letters to people that Jackson knew in Mercer County and told them of Jackson's whereabouts.

After it was determined how to find Jackson, people in Pennsylvania planned for his release and started a fund for expenses. The Governor of North Carolina was asked by Pennsylvania's leader to return Jackson to New Castle. Having learned that North Carolina's governor agreed to Jackson's release, George C. Morgan traveled south. He had a letter of introduction for Mendenhall, a neighbor of Jackson's slaveholder.

In the meantime, Jackson was in jail, having run away from Frederick W. Swann's plantation in Moore County, North Carolina. Mendenhall started legal proceedings to prove Jackson was born free. He also got him out of jail and bought him new clothes. Mendenhall took Jackson to his home, but Swann got word of the arrangements, found him, and took him back to his plantation. Swann was a farmer with 17 slaves in 1860.

When Morgan made it to Swann's plantation, he saw Jackson and was able to point him out by a limp he had when he walked. Jackson identified Morgan as a tailor from New Castle.

Mendenhall had filed a legal suit for $1,500 in damages for having been unlawfully enslaved. The trial began on August 23, 1858. After hearing the evidence of the depositions, the witness statement by George C. Morgan, and statements by others, the jury quickly found that Jackson was born free.

Morgan and Jackson then returned to Pennsylvania on a train, passing through Philadelphia, in September 1858. They returned to New Castle, where his parents still lived.

Later years

According to The History of Lawrence County, Pennsylvania, Jackson returned to New Castle. Jackson lived in Allegheny City, Pennsylvania in 1860 with his wife Susan. He supported his family as a laborer. He enlisted in the Union Army during the American Civil War and was honorably discharged.

Notes

References

19th-century American slaves
19th-century births
African Americans in Pennsylvania
Free Negroes
Kidnapped American people
People from Mercer County, Pennsylvania
People from New Castle, Pennsylvania
People of Pennsylvania in the American Civil War
Union Army soldiers
Year of birth uncertain
Year of death unknown